Beinn Enaiglair (890 m) is a mountain in Wester Ross, Scotland. It lies in the Northwest Highlands.

An outlier of the Beinn Dearg range, it is a mountain in its own right and rises to the east of the settlement of Auchindrean. The peak provides excellent views from its summit.

References

Mountains and hills of the Northwest Highlands
Marilyns of Scotland
Corbetts